Assia Dagher (6 March 1908 – 12 January 1986) was a Lebanese-Egyptian actress and film producer.

Biography
Dagher (Almaza Dagher) was born in Tannourine, Lebanon on March 6, 1908. She moved to Cairo with her sister Mary, and niece Mary Queeny in 1919, when she was only 11 years old,  after the French occupation of Syria and Lebanon. She stayed with Asaad Dagher, her cousin, who was a writer and journalist at the famous Al-Ahram newspaper. She got the Egyptian nationality in 1933.

The first time she acted was in 1926 in a film called Laila, directed by Wadad Orfi. Dagher was the first Lebanese to be on the big screen. She produced over 100 films including Back Again (1957) and Saladin (1963) and played the lead role in only 20 of them.

Filmography

As Producer

As Actress

As Actress

References

External links 

1908 births
1986 deaths
Egyptian film actresses
Egyptian writers
Lebanese film actresses
Lebanese emigrants to Egypt
Lebanese writers
People from Tannourine
Naturalized citizens of Egypt
20th-century Egyptian actresses